Ruining It for Everybody is the second album by Iwrestledabearonce. It was released on July 26, 2011 through Century Media Records and is the first studio full-length since 2009's It's All Happening. This is the last album with original vocalist Krysta Cameron who departed the band in late 2012. Before preparing for their second record, the band released several remix editions of their songs featured on their debut; most notably, the 2010 remix EP It's All Dubstep.

Style and lyrical themes
Guitarist Steven Bradley states that "It's heavier, catchier, and better organized than anything we've done so far. We took a really spastic blend of genres and made it more cohesive." Beforehand, Bradley hosted a prank when he spoke to MetalSucks about the album being "90% black metal", this news was coupled with photos of the band in corpse paint and dark clothing; the controversial gag was revealed as nothing more than a joke days later.

Ruining It for Everybody features a more broad and open selection of lyrical themes than their previous releases. On "Next Visible Delicious", the band makes warnings about the dangers of not thinking for oneself. "People believe anything fed to them if they are told by someone with power that it's truth. Your head will spin trying to rationalize religion, politics, and environment. The song references mother nature becoming fed up with our ways and swallowing us whole. It's a warning of our long-awaited Armageddon. No, not the movie…"

"Button It Up" refers to the kidnapping and soon death of young girls as vocalist Krysta Cameron says "It's a dark song, It tells the tale of a girl who has her life taken from her. I'd read about young girls exploiting their bodies on the Internet and lying about their ages. The next thing you know, they go missing, are raped, and found dead. It's terrifying."

Track listing

Charts

Personnel 
 Iwrestledabearonce
 Steven Bradley – guitar, programming
 Mike “Rickshaw” Martin – bass guitar
 Krysta Cameron – vocals
 John Ganey – guitar, programming
 Mikey Montgomery – drums
Production
 Produced, engineered, and mixed by Steven Bradley and Ryan Boesch
 Additional editing by Nicole Oliva
 Mastered by Alan Douches for West West Side

References 

2011 albums
Iwrestledabearonce albums
Century Media Records albums